Adiantum diaphanum, the filmy maidenhair fern, is a species of fern in the genus Adiantum, native to East Asia and Australasia, from southern Japan south to New Zealand. It grows to 20 cm long at the most, with very dark green fronds covered with bristles.

Distribution
It is native to China (Fujian, Guangdong, Hainan, Jiangxi), Taiwan, Indonesia, Malaysia, Vietnam, Australia, New Zealand and the Pacific islands.

References

diaphanum
Ferns of Asia
Flora of China
Flora of Malesia
Flora of Papuasia
Flora of the Pacific
Plants described in 1828
Taxa named by Carl Ludwig Blume